Carl (or Karl) Joseph Millöcker ( – ), was an Austrian composer of operettas and a conductor.
 
He was born in Vienna, where he studied the flute at the Vienna Conservatory. While holding various conducting posts in the city, he began to compose operettas. The first was Der tote Gast, an operetta in one act, premiered in 1865 with libretto by Ludwig Harisch, after the novel by Heinrich Zschokke.

The international success of Der Bettelstudent enabled him to retire from conducting. However, he never achieved a comparable success afterward.

Carl Millöcker died in Baden bei Wien; on 31 December 1899. He was buried in an honorary grave in Vienna's Zentralfriedhof cemetery (group 32, A35).

Works
See List of operettas and operas by Carl Millöcker.

Notes

References
Lamb, Andrew (1992), 'Millöcker, Carl' in The New Grove Dictionary of Opera, ed. Stanley Sadie (London)

External links

List of Millöcker works at the Index to Opera and Ballet Sources Online

Photo of Millöcker, 1890s
 Broadcast audition " P. Zhuravlenko, F.Chaliapin & S. Guitry, Yvonne Printemps” (cycle " The sound  history of the operette” by Maxim Malkov – in Russian)
 
 
 Works
 
 
 

1842 births
1899 deaths
Composers from Vienna
Austrian Romantic composers
Austrian opera composers
Male opera composers
Burials at the Vienna Central Cemetery
University of Music and Performing Arts Vienna alumni
19th-century classical composers
Austrian male classical composers
19th-century male musicians